Guayabota is a barrio in the municipality of Yabucoa, Puerto Rico. Its population in 2010 was 3,124.

History
Puerto Rico was ceded by Spain in the aftermath of the Spanish–American War under the terms of the Treaty of Paris of 1898 and became an unincorporated territory of the United States. In 1899, the United States Department of War conducted a census of Puerto Rico finding that the population of Guayabota barrio was 904.

Geography
The area is prone to landslides and its infrastructure and bridges have often been destroyed by hurricanes, and even by heavy rainfall.  Puerto Rico Highway 182 goes through this barrio and its sectors.

Hurricane Maria
Hurricane Maria struck the island of Puerto Rico on September 19, 2017, knocking out power to the entire island (and also affected access to clean water). Many older residents of Yabucoa died as a result of Hurricane Maria. The mayor of Yabucoa, Rafael Surillo, stated on June 12, 2018 (nine months after the hurricane) that large swaths of Yabucoa municipality barrios Guayabota, Tejas, Juan Martín, Calabazas, Limones y Aguacate, and 100% of barrio Jácanas were still without electrical power.  In 2018, the people of Guayabota hoped to develop emergency plans and sustainable community plans to help them be prepared in the case of a future emergency, such as happened with Hurricane Irma and Hurricane Maria.

Sectors
Barrios (which are roughly comparable to minor civil divisions) in turn are further subdivided into smaller local populated place areas/units called sectores (sectors in English). The types of sectores may vary, from normally sector to urbanización to reparto to barriada to residencial, among others.

The following sectors are in Guayabota barrio:

See also

 List of communities in Puerto Rico
 List of barrios and sectors of Yabucoa, Puerto Rico

References

Barrios of Yabucoa, Puerto Rico